True Believer is the second studio album by Australian country music artist Troy Cassar-Daley. The album was released in January 1997 and peaked at number 53 on the ARIA Charts. The album came with a 4-track limited edition second disc titled the Tamworth Festival Edition.
  
At the 1998 Country Music Awards in Tamworth, Cassar-Daley won three Gold Guitars – Best Male Vocal and Best Video for his single "Little Things" while the album won Album of the Year.

At the ARIA Music Awards of 1998, the album was nominate for ARIA Award for Best Country Album.

Track listing

Charts

Certifications

Release history

References

1997 albums
Troy Cassar-Daley albums